In descriptions of the Japanese language, an adjectival noun, adjectival, or na-adjective is a noun that can function as an adjective by taking the particle 〜な -na. (In comparison, regular nouns can function adjectivally by taking the particle 〜の -no, which is analyzed as the genitive case.) Adjectival nouns constitute one of several Japanese word classes that can be considered equivalent to adjectives.

In their attributive function, Japanese adjectival nouns function similarly to English noun adjuncts, as in "chicken soup" or "winter coat" – in these cases, the nouns "chicken" and "winter" modify the nouns "soup" and "coat", respectively. Japanese adjectival nouns can also be used predicatively – in that use, they do not take the -na suffix, but normally combine with forms of the copular verb.

Terminology
The terminology used to refer to this word-class is inconsistent. The Japanese name is  keiyō dōshi, which literally means "adjectival verb". This is not necessarily at odds with the English term adjectival noun, since in traditional Japanese grammar, keiyō dōshi includes the copula, while the adjectival noun in the analysis described here does not include the copula. For example, in the traditional grammar, kirei da is a keiyō dōshi and kirei is its stem; in the analysis here, kirei is an adjectival noun and kirei da is its combination with the copula. Considering the copula is a kind of verb and kirei is a kind of noun syntactically, both terminologies make sense.

Grammatically, these words are similar to nouns, or more technically, nominals, which function attributively (like adjectives).  The main differences between these and regular nouns are that nouns take a 〜の -no suffix when acting attributively, while these words take a 〜な -na suffix when acting attributively; most of these words cannot be used as the agent or patient (i.e. subject) of a sentence; and most of these words cannot be modified by relative clauses.  Aside from these differences, Japanese adjectival nouns and regular nouns behave the same way in terms of grammar.  They are variously referred to as "adjectival verbs" (literal translation), "adjectival nouns" (nouns that function adjectivally), "na adjectives" (function as adjectives, take na), and "na nominals" (nominals that take na). For example, Eleanor Harz Jorden refers to them as "na-nominals" in her textbook Japanese: The Spoken Language.

In fact, by some analyses, nouns and na-nominals are fundamentally grammatically the same, where 〜の vs. 〜な when used attributively is simply a conventional stylistic complementary distribution, with 〜の／〜な being allomorphs. This view is reinforced by the fact that some words, such as 特別 tokubetsu "special", can take either a 〜の or a 〜な, depending on the phrase. Ultimately, 〜な is an abbreviation of 〜にある, used to use a noun attributively (compare modern 〜である, which is a more recent form), while 〜の is the genitive case; see etymology, below.

Characterization
In traditional Japanese grammar, adjectival nouns are considered "inflectional", katsuyō, like verbs and i-adjectives, rather than non-inflectional hikatsuyōgo (非活用語) or mukatsuyōgo (無活用語), like nouns.

This is a point of disagreement in current Japanese grammar, and authors such as Uehara (1998) argue that instead, adjectival nouns should be classed with nouns as non-inflectional.

The claim that na-adjectives are inflectional rests on the claim that the syllable da 'is', usually regarded as a "copula verb", is really a suffix – an inflection. Thus, hon 'book', generates a one-word sentence, honda 'it is a book', not a two-word sentence, hon da. However, numerous constructions seem to be incompatible with the suffixal copula claim.

(1) Reduplication for emphasis
Hora! Hon, hon! 'See, it is a book!'
Hora! Kirei, kirei! 'See, it is pretty!'
Hora! Furui, furui! 'See, it is old!' (the adjectival inflection -i cannot be left off)
Hora! Iku, iku! 'See, it does go!' (the verbal inflection -u cannot be left off)

(2) Questions. In Japanese, questions are formed by adding the particle ka (or in colloquial speech, just by changing the intonation of the sentence).
Hon/kirei ka? 'Is it a book? ; Is it pretty?'
Furu-i/Ik-u ka? 'Is it old? ; Does it go?' (the inflections cannot be left off)

(3) Several auxiliary verbs, e.g., mitai, 'looks like it's'
Hon mitai da; Kirei mitai da 'It seems to be a book; It seems to be pretty'
Furu-i mitai da; Ik-u mitai da 'It seems to be old; It seems to go'

On the basis of such constructions, Uehara (1998) finds that the copula is indeed an independent word, and that regarding the parameters on which i-adjectives share the syntactic pattern of verbs, the nominal adjectives pattern with pure nouns instead.

taru adjectives 

In Late Old Japanese (below), a separate kind of tari adjectival nouns developed alongside the existing nari ones (nari, tari were the conclusive forms, while naru, taru were the attributive forms). The nari ones developed into the adjectival nouns (naru contracted to na, while nari was replaced by da (the copula)) that are the subject of this article, while the tari ones mostly died out over the course of Late Middle Japanese, being mostly gone by Early Modern Japanese, surviving as fossils in a few words which are generally considered somewhat stiff or archaic. These are generally referred to as ト・タル形容動詞 (to, taru keiyōdōshi) or タルト型活用 (taruto-kata katsuyō – “taru, to form conjugation”), and can also function adverbially with 〜と -to, instead of the 〜に -ni which is mostly used with な nominals. See taru adjectives for further discussion in English, and 形容動詞#タルト型活用 for Japanese.

naru adjectives 

A few nari adjectival nouns followed a similar path to tari adjectival nouns, becoming naru adjectives in Modern Japanese (analogous to taru adjectives), rather than na adjectives as most nari adjectival nouns did. These include 単なる tannaru "mere, simple" or 聖なる seinaru "holy" and are generally classed as rentaishi.

Historical Forms

Old Japanese 
Old Japanese has one type of adjectival noun with the following inflections.

Late Old Japanese 
Late Old Japanese has two types of adjectival nouns: nar- and tar-.

The newly developed tar- inflections are used in kanbun kundoku (reading a Chinese text in Japanese).

Early Middle Japanese 
Early Middle Japanese has two types of adjectival nouns: na- and tar-.

Late Middle Japanese 
Late Middle Japanese has two types of adjectival nouns: na and t-.

Early Modern Japanese (Kamigata) 
The early half of Early Middle Japanese as exhibited in the Kamigata region has a single type of adjectival noun with the following inflections.

The deteriorating tar- type is lost.

Early Modern Japanese (Edo) 
The later half of Early Modern Japanese as found in Edo has a single type of adjectival noun with the following inflections. These forms are identical to the modern forms.

Modern Japanese
There is one type of adjectival noun in modern usage, with inflections as follows.

The modern inflections are based on two primitive forms: d- and n-. The n- forms are historically older while the d- forms are newer and have replaced some of the older n- forms.
Irrealis -daro is found with particle -u, resulting in -darou (-darō). Historically it was -dara. /au/ regularly changed into [ō].
Adverbial -daQ is often found with past particle -ta, resulting in "daQta" -> "datta".
Adverbial -de is found before "aru" and "nai", as well as being used in to terminate one clause before beginning another (中止法).
Adverbial -ni is used in adverbial constructions.
Modern Japanese no longer inflects for imperative.

Etymology
Japanese adjectival nouns differ in etymological origin from adjectival verbs. Whereas adjectival verbs are almost entirely native in origin, the class of adjectival nouns comprises mostly foreign loanwords and a small subset of polymorphemic native words. All words listed in this section take the attributive -na and predicative -da copula.

Loanwords 
Most adjectival nouns are of primarily Chinese origin, but there is a not-insignificant quantity of adjectival noun loanwords from other languages as well (most notably English.)

Chinese Origin (Sino-Japanese vocabulary)

English Origin (gairaigo)

French Origin

Native Words 
In addition to loanwords, within the class of adjectival nouns also exists a small subset of native Japanese words (wago). Nishiyama (1999) asserts that this helps to distinguish native adjectival nouns from native adjectival verbs.

Native Adjectival Nouns

Copula -na/-da
All forms of the copula (the vehicle for the inflection of adjectival nouns) can be considered to derive from two infinitive forms, ni and to. Because the copula lacked any other forms, secondary conjugations with the verb ari were used. The original ni ari and to ari contracted to form nari and tari. To derive the modern forms na and da, changes such as the following have been proposed.

For attributive na (rentaikei):
ni aru > naru > na

For predicative da (shūshikei):
ni te ari > de ari > de a > da

In some regions, these changes progressed differently, resulting in forms such as ja (Chūgoku, Shikoku, or Kyūshū; particularly common in Hiroshima) or ya (associated with Kansai dialect, particularly Ōsaka.)

The infinitive form ni is still in widespread use (e.g. hen ni naru, "become strange"), but the form to has become a much rarer alternative for use with adjectives.

Internal properties
The internal properties of Japanese adjectival nouns can be analysed either through a lexical features approach or through a Distributed Morphology approach.

Chomsky's lexical properties 
Miyagawa argues that Japanese adjectival nouns can be classified using Noam Chomsky's lexical feature system. He proposed the following analysis for Japanese lexical categories:

Japanese Lexical Categories

Under this system, Japanese adjectival nouns are classed similarly to English pure adjectives [+V, +N]. However, because Japanese also has adjectival verbs with the lexical property [+V], it is observed that Japanese adjectival nouns and English pure adjectives are distinct.

Morphological tree structure 

The internal morphological structure of Japanese adjectival phrases can be represented by the following trees:

Within the tree structures, the word root combines with the functional category n0 to become a noun, then combine with the functional head a0 to form an adjective. Both nouns and adjectives contain the root-n0 combination, and it is the presence of a0 that results in the appearance of the attributive copula -na.

See also
 Japanese adjectives
 Japanese grammar
 Japanese verb conjugation

References

Fujino, Hanako. 2013. The Acquisition of Japanese Nominal Modifying Constructions. Cambridge Scholars Publishing. .
 Jorden, Eleanor Harz, Noda, Mari. 1987. Japanese: The Spoken Language
Miyagawa, Shigeru. Lexical Categories in Japanese. Lingua, Volume 73, Issues 1–2, 1987. pp 29–51.
Morita, Chigusa. (2010). The Internal Structures of Adjectives in Japanese. 26. 105–117. URL: https://www.researchgate.net/publication/280736570_The_Internal_Structures_of_Adjectives_in_Japanese
Nishiyama, Kunio. July 1999. Adjectives and the Copulas in Japanese. Journal of East Asian Linguistics, Vol. 8, No. 3, pp. 183–222. Stable URL:  https://www.jstor.org/stable/20100764
 Uehara, Satoshi. 1998. Syntactic categories in Japanese: a cognitive and typological introduction. Kurosio. Series: Studies in Japanese linguistics; 9.

Nouns by type
Japanese grammar

de:Japanische Grammatik#Na-Adjektive